Margaret Miller is a Canadian politician, who was elected to the Nova Scotia House of Assembly in the 2013 provincial election. A member of the Nova Scotia Liberal Party, she represented the electoral district of Hants East until 2021.

On January 12, 2016, Miller was appointed to the Executive Council of Nova Scotia as Minister of Environment.

Miller was re-elected in the 2017 election. On June 15, 2017, premier Stephen McNeil shuffled his cabinet, moving Miller to Minister of Natural Resources. On July 5, 2018, Miller returned to her former position as Minister of Environment in a cabinet shuffle.

On November 29, 2018, Miller announced that she will not run in the next election. On April 24, 2019, she was shuffled out of cabinet.

Electoral record

|-

|Liberal
|Margaret Miller
|align="right"|4,512
|align="right"|47.39 
|align="right"|
|-
 
|New Democratic Party
|John MacDonell
|align="right"|3,412
|align="right"|35.84
|align="right"|
|-

|Progressive Conservative
|Kim Allan Williams
|align="right"|1,597
|align="right"|16.77
|align="right"|
|}

References

Year of birth missing (living people)
Living people
Members of the Executive Council of Nova Scotia
Nova Scotia Liberal Party MLAs
People from Hants County, Nova Scotia
Women MLAs in Nova Scotia
21st-century Canadian politicians
21st-century Canadian women politicians
Women government ministers of Canada